Guilherme Moretto is a Brazilian-American entrepreneur. He is the 1st and current President of Miami Dade FC, an American soccer team based in Miami.

Biography 
Born in Santos, Brazil, he has been living in the United States since 2009.

He started to play soccer in Santos when he was 4 years-old, being in the same group with Junior Moraes and Bruno Moraes, sons of Aluisio Guerreiro. Moretto played soccer collegiately for over 14 years, he played for Servico Social da Industria – SESI; UNIMED; and Instituto Luis de Camoes, winning several local tournaments. During this period he faced notable opponents such as Robinho. Moretto stopped playing soccer in 2001.

Moretto is a lifetime soccer fan and a supporter of the soccer development in the United States.

Moretto holds a bachelor's degree in Electrical Engineering and Electronic modality from the Universidade Santa Cecília in Brazil, where he was valedictorian.

Miami Dade FC
On May 20, 2014, Moretto was announced as the 1st president in the history of Miami Dade FC.

Moretto is responsible for all the aspects of the club's performance and service.

Honours

Miami Dade FC
American Premier Soccer League 2016 Regular Season Champions
American Premier Soccer League 2017 Regular Season Champions
American Premier Soccer League 2017 APSL Champions

References

Sources

Living people
Businesspeople from São Paulo
Brazilian people of Italian descent
Brazilian businesspeople
Italian football chairmen and investors
Brazilian emigrants to the United States
American people of Italian descent
People of Campanian descent
People from Santos, São Paulo
Citizens of Italy through descent
21st-century American businesspeople
Year of birth missing (living people)